The 1922 Brooklyn Robins struggled all season, finishing in sixth place.

Offseason 
 December 1921: Ferdie Schupp was purchased from the Robins by the Chicago White Sox.
 January 24, 1922: Sam Crane was purchased by the Robins from the Cincinnati Reds.
 March 14, 1922: Possum Whitted was purchased by the Robins from the Pittsburgh Pirates.

Regular season

Season standings

Record vs. opponents

Roster

Player stats

Batting

Starters by position 
Note: Pos = Position; G = Games played; AB = At bats; H = Hits; Avg. = Batting average; HR = Home runs; RBI = Runs batted in

Other batters 
Note: G = Games played; AB = At bats; H = Hits; Avg. = Batting average; HR = Home runs; RBI = Runs batted in

Pitching

Starting pitchers 
Note: G = Games pitched; IP = Innings pitched; W = Wins; L = Losses; ERA = Earned run average; SO = Strikeouts

Other pitchers 
Note: G = Games pitched; IP = Innings pitched; W = Wins; L = Losses; ERA = Earned run average; SO = Strikeouts

Relief pitchers 
Note: G = Games pitched; W = Wins; L = Losses; SV = Saves; ERA = Earned run average; SO = Strikeouts

References

External links
Baseball-Reference season page
Baseball Almanac season page
1922 Brooklyn Robins uniform
Brooklyn Dodgers reference site
Acme Dodgers page 
Retrosheet

Los Angeles Dodgers seasons
Brooklyn Robins season
Brooklyn Robins season
1920s in Brooklyn
Flatbush, Brooklyn